Jerry D. Jackson (born October 7, 1941) is an American politician. He served as a Democratic member for the 9-3 district of the Georgia House of Representatives.

Born in Jackson County, Georgia, Jackson attended North Hall High School, graduating in 1959. In 1975, he won election in the 9-3 district of the Georgia House of Representatives. Jackson served until the 1990s. He had worked as a real estate agent.

References 

1941 births
Living people
People from Jackson County, Georgia
Democratic Party members of the Georgia House of Representatives
20th-century American politicians
American real estate brokers